Yeni Malatyaspor Kulübü is a Turkish professional football club based in Malatya, Turkey. The club plays in the TFF First League, which is the second tier of football in the country.

History 
Founded in 1986 as Malatya Belediyespor. Its primary colors are yellow, black, and red, although they originally wore orange and green. 

In 2022, the club's chairman Adil Gevrek resigned from his position, the same season the club guaranteed its relegation to the TFF First League.

Goalkeeper Ahmet Eyüp Türkaslan was killed by rubble from a collapsed building in the aftermath of the 2023 Turkey–Syria earthquake on February 6. Following the earthquake, the club withdrew from the league.

League appearances 

 Süper Lig: 2017–2022
 TFF First League: 1999–00, 2015–17, 2022–
 TFF Second League: 1998–99, 2000–01, 2008–09, 2010–15
 TFF Third League: 2007–08, 2009–10
 Amateur League: 1986–98, 2001–07

Club honours 
Leagues
TFF First League: Runners-up: 2016–17
TFF Second League: League champions: 2014–15
TFF Third League: Play-off champions: 2009–10

European record

As of 15 August 2019

Notes
 QR: Qualifying round

Players

Current squad

Out on loan

References

External links 
Official website
Yeni Malatyaspor on TFF.org

 
Football clubs in Turkey
Sport in Malatya
1986 establishments in Turkey
Süper Lig clubs